Shelton Nunataks are two isolated nunataks located 10 miles (16 km) southeast of Thomas Mountains, in Palmer Land. Mapped by United States Geological Survey (USGS) from surveys and U.S. Navy air photos, 1961–67. Named by Advisory Committee on Antarctic Names (US-ACAN) for Willard S. Shelton, electrician at Eights Station in 1964.

Nunataks of Palmer Land